BLUESAmericana is the twelfth studio album by Keb' Mo'. It was released on April 22, 2014, through the Kind of Blue Music label. It earned a Grammy nomination for Best Americana Album.

Track listing
"The Worst Is Yet to Come" (Heather Donovan/Kevin Moore/Pete Sallis) 3:57
"Somebody Hurt You" (Kevin Moore/John Lewis Parker) 3:34
"Do It Right" (Kevin Moore/Jim Weatherly) 4:08
"I’m Gonna Be Your Man” (Kevin Moore/John Lewis Parker) 4:34
"Move" (Tom Hambridge/Kevin Moore) 4:32
"For Better Or Worse" (Tom Hambridge/Kevin Moore) 3:25
That's Alright" (Jimmy Rogers) 4:15
"Old Me Better" (Kevin Moore/John Lewis Parker) 2:56
"More For Your Money" (Kevin Moore/Gary Nicholson) 2:48
"So Long Goodbye" (Rebecca Correia/Kevin Moore) 3:53

Personnel
Keb’ Mo' - Banjo ( tr.1, 3, 5, 8 ) Bass ( tr.2,4, 6, 7, 9, 10 ), Acoustic Guitar ( tr.3, 10 ), Electric Guitar ( tr.2, 7 ), Resonator Guitar ( tr.4 ), Harmonica ( tr.1, 3, 4, 7 ), Horn Arrangements, Keyboards ( tr.2, 4 ), Organ ( tr.3, 7, 10 ), Piano (  tr.10 ), Slide Guitar ( tr.3, 4, 6, 7 ), Tambourine ( tr.1 ), Electric Piano ( tr.5 ) Producer

Brian Allen - Bass ( tr. 1, 5 )
Zach Allen - Engineer, Tracking
Brandon Armstrong - Sousaphone ( tr.8 )
Roland Barber - Trombone ( tr.4 )
Leigh Brannon - Production Manager, Project Manager
Robbie Brooks-Moore - Background Vocals
John Caldwell - Engineer, Tracking
The California Feet Warmers - Featured Artist
Rebecca Corriea - Composer
Darcy Stewart - Background Vocals
Charles Decastro - Trumpet ( tr.8 )
Richard Dodd - Mastering
Heather Donovan - Composer
Paul Franklin - Pedal Steel ( tr.5, 6 )
Tom Hambridge - Drums, Composer ( tr.5 )
Michael Hanna - Piano, Organ ( tr. 1 ), piano ( tr.8 )
Michael Hicks - Organ, Background Vocals ( tr.4, 5 )
Ross Hogarth - Mixing
Steve Jordan - Drums ( tr.7 )
Joshua Kaufman - Clarinet  ( tr. 8 )
Tim Lauer - Organ, Piano ( tr.6, 8 )
David Leonard - Engineer, Tracking
Melvin “Maestro” Lightford - Horn Arrangements
Colin Linden - Handclapping, Mandolin ( tr.1 )
Andrea Lucero - Photography
Jeffrey Moran - Banjo ( tr.8 )
Patrick Morrison - Banjo [Plectrum] ( tr. 8 )
Moiba Mustafa - Background Vocals
Gary Nicholson - Composer
John Lewis Parker - Composer
Rip Patton - Vocals (Background)
Jovan Quallo - Sax (Tenor) ( tr.4 )
Juan Carlos Reynoso - Washboard ( tr.8 )
Dominique Rodriguez - Drums [Parade] ( tr. 8 )
Jimmy Rogers - Composer
Justin Rubenstein - Trombone ( tr. 8 )
Pete Sallis - Composer
John Schirmer - Engineer, Tracking
Meghan Aileen Schirmer - Cover Design, Package Design
Victoria Shaw - Composer
Tom Shinness - Cello, Mandolin (tr. 9 )
Kevin So - Background Vocals
Keio Stroud - Drums ( tr.1, 3, 4, 6, 8, 10 )
Quentin Ware - Trumpet( tr.4 ) 
Casey Wasner - Bass ( tr.3 ), Drums ( tr.2, 9 ), Engineer, Producer, Tracking
Jim Weatherly - Composer
Joe Wood - Handclapping

References

Keb' Mo' albums
2014 albums